is a Japanese actress represented by Kart Promotion.

Takeshima's hobbies are dancing, watching films, and reading. Her skills are playing the flute, playing baton, and dancing to buyō.

Filmography

TV series

Films

Stage

Advertisements

Music videos

Bibliography

Magazines

References

External links
Official profile 
Official Blog 

1987 births
Living people
Actresses from Tokyo